The Torneo Top 4 de Básquet (English: Top 4 Basketball Tournament) was a national domestic professional basketball cup tournament that was contested between clubs from Argentina's top-tier level Liga Nacional de Básquet (LNB).  A similar system was planned for 2015-16.

Format
The Torneo Top 4 was contested between the top four placed clubs in the regular season league standings of the Argentine top-tier level league, the Liga Nacional de Básquet (LNB). The tournament took place after the first half of the league's regular season was completed.  The top four placed teams at the half-way point of the LNB's regular season contested the cup tournament.

History
The Torneo Top 4 was originally contested between 2002 and 2004.  In 2005 it was replaced by the Torneo Súper 8 (Super 8 Tournament).

Winners

See also
LNB
Torneo Súper 8
Copa Argentina
Torneo InterLigas

References

External links
Official website 
Pick and Roll (news, info & statistics) 
Argentinian league on Latinabasket.com

2004 establishments in Argentina
Basketball cup competitions in Argentina
Basketball cup competitions in South America